The P4000 is a low-cost, low-profile terminal server produced by Lantronix during the mid-1990s. As the industry's first compact design terminal server, it found it way to shops that were looking for low-cost access methods to a fast-growing base of DEC VAX server products. The P4000 was fixed in port count (16) and housed in a plastic shell with the industry's first terminal server with LCD status screen.

Minicomputers